Phulbari is a town and Village Development Committee  in Dang Deokhuri District in Lumbini Province of south-western Nepal. At the time of the 1991 Nepal census, it had 4,462 persons residing in 745 individual households.

References

External links
UN map of the municipalities of Dang Deokhuri District

Populated places in Dang District, Nepal